Virginia Cha is a Korean American news anchor for KGTV-TV, San Diego.  She was formerly employed at HLN based in Atlanta, and as an NBC News correspondent based in New York.

Cha graduated from Princeton University and is a Fulbright Scholar.

Professional career
Cha began her news career at WFSB in Hartford, Connecticut. She was a general assignment reporter, substitute anchor, then head anchor and reporter for the morning news.

She then became a news anchor and chief medical correspondent for WBZ TV-4 in Boston, Massachusetts, where she won three Emmy Awards for Outstanding Individual Achievement and a National Edward R. Murrow Award for Team Political Coverage.

She was an anchor on MSNBC's MSNBC Live, NBC's NBC Nightly News, and CNN and CNN's HLN.

Personal life
Cha is married to Edward. Cha was Miss Frederick when she entered and won the Miss Maryland 1989 pageant.  She was 1st runner-up to Debbye Turner at the 1990 Miss America pageant. She plays the piano.

References

Year of birth missing (living people)
Living people
American people of Korean descent
American television reporters and correspondents
Television anchors from Boston
CNN people
Miss America 1990 delegates
Princeton University alumni
People from Frederick, Maryland
American women television journalists
21st-century American women